Tapinoma pomone is a species of ant in the genus Tapinoma. Described by Donisthorpe in 1947, the species is endemic to Mauritius.

References

Tapinoma
Hymenoptera of Africa
Insects described in 1947